Baqa al-Gharbiyye (lit. Baqa West) is a predominantly Arab city in the "Triangle" region of Israel near the Green Line. In 2003, Baqa al-Gharbiyye united with the Jatt local council to form Baqa-Jatt, a unification that was dissolved a few years later.

History
Pottery remains from the Intermediate Bronze Age, Iron Age II and Hellenistic era have been found here.

Roman, Byzantine and Umayyad eras
An olive press, quarries and a winepress seeming to date to the Hellenistic or Early Roman period have been found. Ceramic objects from the late Roman or early Byzantine periods have also been found, and a burial cave, with remains dating to Byzantine and the beginning of the Umayyad periods (sixth–seventh centuries CE).

Crusader/Mamluk eras
In 1265 Sultan Baibars divided the village between the emirs 'Ala' al-Din Taibars al-Zahiri and Ala' al-Din 'Ali al-Tunkuzi when the villages of Palestine were divided and given to the fighters who fought against the Crusaders.

Ottoman era
Baqa was mentioned in an Ottoman document in 1538, as a five-family small village with 11 non-married people. In 1596, Baqa al-Gharbiyye appeared in Ottoman tax registers as being in the Nahiya of Jabal Shami, part of the Sanjak of Nablus. It had a population of 5 Muslim households who paid a fixed tax rate of 33.3% on wheat, barley, summer crops, goats or beehives, and a press for olives or grapes; a total of 12,000 akçe. Half of the revenue went to the waqf of al-Haramayn as-Sarifayn.

In 1799, Pierre Jacotin misplaced Atil instead of Baka, on his map made during the French campaign in Egypt and Syria.

In 1838 it was noted as a village, Bakah, the west, in the western Esh-Sha'rawiyeh administrative region, north of Nablus.

In 1870, the French explorer Victor Guérin visited the village. He described it as standing on a low hill. A few wells and cisterns looked ancient, the rest had a modern appearance. He estimated the population to be 1500.

In 1882 the Palestine Exploration Fund's Survey of Western Palestine described Baqa al-Gharbiyye as a village of moderate size, very white and conspicuous. It had a few olive trees, and orchards to the south.

British Mandate
In the 1922 census of Palestine conducted by the British Mandate authorities, Baqa Gharbiyeh had a population of 1,443; 1442 Muslim and one Anglican Christian. In the 1931 census of Palestine, Baqa was recorded as having a population of 1,640 Muslims living in 403 houses. These numbers included the nearby smaller locality El Manshiya.

Like other Palestinian villages during the Arab Revolt of 1936-1939 a strict British martial law controlled the village. When the battles reached a peak in 1938 a state of emergency was declared by Britain and tough collective punishment was imposed on every village where militants were found. A British military camp was established near the al-Madrasa al-Foqa School.

On 25 August 1938 a clash took place between British troops and local militants and resulted in an armed battle which resulted two dead British officers and injuring three militants. The same day British military forces stormed the village and larger battles begun and continued until next day morning by which British losses raised to three.

The next day, 26 August 1938, the British ordered the villagers to leave homes without taking anything with them and those who refused were taken out by force, and they were driven to a nearby camp. Later on raids over the village started and continued until evening, leaving a great devastation for such a small village then: most of the wooden homes were burnt and over 70 homes were flattened. After the raids were over the villagers were forced to walk to the Nur al-Shams Camp near Tulkarm. The next day the villagers returned to the village to find out the huge damage that occurred to Baqa, and the news spread out quickly in the Palestinian cities. This was one of the largest British attacks on a Palestinian village during the revolt. Older generation from the village tells that in this attack men from the village were arrested, led by a group of women, women and children walked to the camp and threw stones and rocks towards the camp to free those who were arrested. 

In the 1945 statistics the population of Baqa al-Gharbiyye (including Manshiyat Baqa) consisted of 2,240 Muslims with a total land area of 21,116 dunams, according to an official land and population survey. Of this, 861 dunams were designated for plantations and irrigable land, 18,986 for cereals, while 76 dunams were built-up (urban) areas.

Israel

In the early years of Israeli independence, Baqa al-Gharbiyye was one of the headquarters of the Israeli military administration. The land holdings of the town, which had been 21,116 dunams in 1945, were reduced to 8,228 dunams by 1962, mostly due to expropriation in 1953–1954. In 1963, the Baka canning plant went into partnership with Priman, an Israeli company that relocated to Baqa al-Gharibiyye.

In 1996, Baqa al-Gharbiyye was declared a city. In 2003 it was combined with the nearby town Jatt to become the city of Baqa-Jatt.

Baqa al-Gharbiyye is separated from its West Bank sister city, Baqa ash-Sharqiyya (or Baqa East), by the Israeli West Bank barrier which in this section coincides with the Green Line. As a result, a concrete wall topped with barbed wire runs through one neighbourhood.

As the Israeli foreign minister in April and June 2008, Tzipi Livni raised the possibility of territorial exchange with Palestinian Authority President Mahmoud Abbas. She proposed transferring Israeli Arab communities, among them Baqa al-Gharbiyeh, to the Palestinian side of the border. The Palestinians rejected the proposal.

Demographics 

In 2019, the official population was 29.000. Together with Jatt (11,000) the estimated population is 40,000. The ethnic makeup of the city is entirely Muslim Arab, with no Jewish population and some European and foreign exceptions.  The city is made up of 51% males and 49% females. Baqa has a population growth rate of 3.1%. The population of the city is spread out, with 48.6% 19 years of age or younger, 18.4% between 20 and 29, 18.9% between 30 and 44, 9.5% from 45 to 59, 1.8% from 60 to 64, and 2.8% 65 years of age or older.

Education and culture 

According to CBS, 47.8% of 12th grade students were entitled to a matriculation certificate in 2001. There are 6 elementary school, two junior-high schools and two high school, in addition to a private school. In addition to the official education institutions, Baqa has a wide range of private educational institutions which provide services to the city residents as well as people from the whole region. In addition, The Al-Rahma School in the city provides Special education for the city and the surrounding towns and villages.

The Al-Qasemi Academic College of Education, located in the city, as well-known students come to it for studying from all around the country, and has a combined Arab and Jewish faculty. The college is growing and expanding rapidly as a part of the Al-Qasemi group of projects for establishing high-standards private education in the city including the private school, a library and several centers for extra-education.

Economy 
Baqa al-Gharbiyye is considered a commercial and industrial center for nearby towns, villages and kibbutzim. There are over 400 workshops in Baqa. Industrial zones make up 8.5% of city's area.

Environmental issues
In 2007, the mayors of Baqa al-Gharbiyya and Baqa ash-Sharqiyya signed an agreement to clean up Wadi Abu Nar, a polluted stream that runs through both villages. The mayors also committed to protecting the mountain aquifer, the most important underground water source for Israelis and Palestinians, by establishing an authorized sewage grid-system. Baqa al-Gharbiyya agreed to connect the town's sewage treatment plant with a waste disposal network in Baqa al Sharkiya.

Notable people

 Faras Hamdan
 Aya Maasarwe
 Raleb Majadele
 Khaled Abu Toameh

References

Bibliography

External links
Welcome To Baqa al-Gharbiya
Survey of Western Palestine, Map 11:    IAA, Wikimedia commons 
 אתר העירייה موقع بلدية باقة الغربية http://baqa.co.il/

Populated places in Haifa District
Cities in Haifa District
Arab localities in Israel
Triangle (Israel)

de:Baqa-Jatt#Baqa al-Gharbiyye